Knack Point is a point at the termination of a flat-topped spur which marks the north end of the Long Hills in the Horlick Mountains of Antarctica. it was mapped by the United States Geological Survey from surveys and U.S. Navy aerial photographs, 1958–60, and was named by the Advisory Committee on Antarctic Names for Joseph V. Knack, a meteorologist at Byrd Station in 1958.

References

Headlands of Wilkes Land